M. libyca  may refer to:
 Macaca libyca, a prehistoric monkey species
 Mawsonia libyca, an extinct fish species